Ano Ekklisia is a village of the Grevena municipality, in Western Macedonia. Before the 2011 local government reform it was a part of the municipality of Agios Kosmas. The 2011 census recorded 25 residents in the village. Ano Ekklisia is a part of the community of Agios Kosmas.

Name
Ano Ekklisia means "Upper Church".

See also
 List of settlements in the Grevena regional unit

References

Populated places in Grevena (regional unit)